"Deep End Freestyle" is a song by American rapper Sleepy Hallow featuring American singer Fousheé. It was released on April 3, 2020 by Winners Circle Entertainment, and is the lead single from his mixtape Sleepy Hallow Presents: Sleepy for President (2020). Produced by Great John, the song features a sample of "Deep End" by Fousheé. The song is the first charting song on the Billboard Hot 100 for both artists, peaking at number 80. It went viral via TikTok.

Composition
The song uses with a drill instrumental that comes along with a sample of looped vocals sung by Fousheé on her song "Deep End": "I been trying not to go off the deep end, I don't think you wanna give me a reason". Sleepy Hallow raps one verse, with no chorus.

Charts

Certifications

References

2020 singles
2020 songs
Sleepy Hallow songs
Songs written by Sleepy Hallow